The 2021–22 network television schedule for the five major English commercial broadcast networks in Canada covers primetime hours from September 2021 through August 2022. The schedule is followed by a list per network of returning series, new series, and series cancelled after the 2020–21 television season, for Canadian, American and other series. CBC was first to announce its fall schedule on June 2, 2021, followed by Citytv and Global on June 8, and CTV on June 10. Yes TV,  and Omni Television are not included as member television stations have local flexibility over most of their schedules. CTV 2 is not included on Friday or Saturday as it normally only schedules encore programming in primetime on Saturdays.

Legend

 Grey indicates encore programming.
 Blue-grey indicates news programming.
 Light green indicates sporting events/coverage.

 Red indicates Canadian content shows, which is programming that originated in Canada.

 Light yellow indicates the current schedule.

Schedule
 New series to Canadian television are highlighted in bold.
 All times given are in Canadian Eastern Time and Pacific Time (except for some live events or specials, including most sports, which are given in Eastern Time). Subtract one hour for Central time for most programs (excluding CBC). Airtimes may vary in the Atlantic and Mountain times and do not necessarily align with U.S. stations in the Mountain time zone. Add one half-hour to Atlantic Time schedule for Newfoundland time. (See also: Effects of time zones on North American broadcasting)
 Dates (e.g., (9/13)) indicate the first month and day of a program in its regular timeslot, not necessarily the premiere date.

Sunday

Monday

Tuesday

Wednesday

{| class=wikitable style=width:100%;margin-right:0;text-align:center
|-
! style=width:8% colspan=2| Network
! style=width:11.5%|7:00 p.m.
! style=width:11.5%|7:30 p.m.
! style=width:11.5%|8:00 p.m.
! style=width:11.5%|8:30 p.m.
! style=width:11.5%"|9:00 p.m.
! style=width:11.5%|9:30 p.m.
! style=width:11.5%|10:00 p.m.
! style=width:11.5%|10:30 p.m.
|-
! rowspan=2| CBC
! Fall
| rowspan=2| Coronation Street
| style=background:#F08080 rowspan=2| Family Feud Canada 
| colspan=2| War of the Worlds 
| style=background:#F08080 colspan=2|Diggstown 
| style=background:#6699CC colspan=2 rowspan=2| 
|-
! Winter
| style=background:#F08080| Still Standing 
| style=background:#F08080| Run the Burbs 
| style=background:#F08080 colspan=2| Pretty Hard Cases 
|-
! rowspan=2| Citytv
! Fall
| style=background:#C0C0C0 colspan=2 rowspan=2|Mom 
| colspan=2|Chicago Med 
| colspan=2|Chicago Fire 
| colspan=2|Chicago P.D. 
|-
! Summer
| colspan=2|America's Got Talent 
| colspan=2|So You Think You Can Dance
| style=background:#C0C0C0 colspan=2|Mom 
|-
! rowspan=4| CTV
! Fall
| style=background:#F08080| Etalk 
| The Wonder Years 
| colspan=2| The Masked Singer
| rowspan=3| The Conners 
| rowspan=3| Home Economics 
| colspan=2| Alter Ego 
|-
! Winter
| colspan=2| The Amazing Race 
| style=background:#F08080| Children Ruin Everything 
| The Wonder Years 
| colspan=2| Next Level Chef 
|-
! Spring
| style=background:#F08080 rowspan=2|Etalk
| The Wonder Years| colspan=2|The Masked Singer 
| colspan=2|Domino Masters 
|-
! Summer
| style=background:#C0C0C0| The Big Bang Theory 
| colspan=2|MasterChef
| colspan=2|The Challenge: USA 
| style=background:#C0C0C0 |The Big Bang Theory 
| style=background:#C0C0C0 |The Big Bang Theory 
|-
! rowspan=2| CTV 2
! Fall
| style=background:#C0C0C0 rowspan=2| The Big Bang Theory 
| style=background:#f08080 rowspan=2| Etalk 
| rowspan=2|The Goldbergs 
| style=background:#C0C0C0 rowspan=2| The Goldbergs 
| colspan=2 | In the Dark
| style=background:#C0C0C0 colspan=2 rowspan=2| Criminal Minds 
|-
! Spring
| colspan=2|Kung Fu 
|-
! rowspan=5| Global
! Fall
| rowspan=3|ET
| style=background:#f08080 rowspan=3|ET Canada 
| colspan=2|Survivor 
| colspan=2|Tough as Nails 
| colspan=2|CSI: Vegas 
|-
! Winter
| colspan=2|I Can See Your Voice 
| Abbott Elementary 
| style=background:#C0C0C0|Ghosts 
| colspan=2 rowspan=3|Good Sam 
|-
! Late winter
| colspan=2|Celebrity Big Brother 
| colspan=2|I Can See Your Voice
|-
! Spring
| style=background:#f08080 colspan=2|Big Brother Canada 
| colspan=2|Survivor 
| colspan=2|Beyond the Edge 
|-
! Summer
| ET
| style=background:#f08080|ET Canada 
| colspan=2|Big Brother 
| style=background:#f08080 colspan=2|Departure 
| style=background:#C0C0C0 colspan=2| 
|}

Thursday

Friday

Saturday

By network
CBCReturning series:22 Minutes
Arctic Vets
Coroner
Diggstown
Dragon's Den
Family Feud Canada
The Fifth Estate
The Great Canadian Baking Show
Halifax Comedy Fest
Heartland
Hot Docs at Home
Marketplace
Murdoch Mysteries
The National
The Passionate Eye
Pretty Hard Cases
The Nature of Things
The New Wave of Standup
Still Standing
TallBoyz
Victoria
War of the Worlds
Winnipeg Comedy Festival
Workin' MomsNew series:MoonshineThe PorterRace Against the TideRun the BurbsSon of a CritchSort OfStraysA Suitable BoyTravel Man: 48 Hours In...Not returning from 2020–21:Baroness von Sketch Show
Battle of the Blades
Burden of Truth
Frankie Drake Mysteries
Kim's Convenience
Trickster

CitytvReturning series:American Idol
America's Got Talent
The Bachelorette
Bachelor in Paradise USA
Black-ish
Canada's Got Talent (returning from 2011–12)
Chicago Fire
Chicago Med
Chicago P.D.
Dancing with the Stars
Duncanville
Fall in Love Fridays
Hudson & Rex
Hockey Night In Canada
Kenan
Law & Order
Law & Order: Organized Crime
Law & Order: Special Victims Unit (moved from CTV)
Mr. Mayor
So You Think You Can Dance (new to Citytv)
Young RockNew series:American AutoThe Bachelor After ShowBachelor in Paradise CanadaThe EndgameGrand CrewOrdinary JoeThat's My JamNot returning from 2020–21:Bless the Harts
Bob's Burgers (moved to Disney+)
Brooklyn Nine-Nine
Card Sharks
Family Guy (moved to Disney+)
The Great North (moved to Disney+)
Manifest (moved to Netflix)
A Million Little Things (moved to W Network)
Mixed-ish
Mom
The Republic of Sarah
The Simpsons (moved to Disney+)
The Twilight Zone

CTV/CTV 2Returning series:9-1-1: Lone Star
The Amazing Race
The Amazing Race Canada (returning from 2018–19)
B Positive
Big Sky
Blue Bloods
Bob Hearts Abishola
Call Me Kat
Celebrity Wheel of Fortune (moved from Yes TV)
The Conners
Etalk
The Goldbergs
The Good Doctor
Grey's Anatomy
Holey Moley
Home Economics
Jann
Kung Fu
Magnum P.I.
MasterChef
MasterChef Junior (returning from 2018–19)
The Masked Singer
The Resident
The Rookie
Shark Tank
Station 19
Supermarket Sweep
This Is Us
Transplant (returning from 2019–20)
The Voice
W5
Weakest Link
Young SheldonNew series:AGT: ExtremeAll American: HomecomingAlter EgoThe Big LeapChildren Ruin EverythingThe Cleaning LadyDancing with MyselfDomino MastersJoe Millionaire: For Richer or PoorerJudge Steve HarveyLa BreaNext Level ChefOur Kind of PeoplePasswordPivotingQueensThe Real Dirty DancingThe Unusual SuspectsThe Wonder YearsNot returning from 2020–21:All Rise
American Housewife
The Celebrity Dating Game
Ellen's Game of Games
Filthy Rich
For Life
Holmes Family Effect
 L.A.'s Finest
Law & Order: Special Victims Unit (moved to Citytv)
MasterChef Canada
Match Game
Rebel
The Masked Dancer

GlobalReturning series:9-1-1
48 Hours
60 Minutes
Big Brother Canada
The Blacklist
Bull
Celebrity Big Brother
Crime Beat
Departure
The Equalizer
ET
ET Canada
FBI: Most Wanted
NCIS
NCIS: Los Angeles
The Neighborhood
New Amsterdam
The New Reality
SEAL Team
Survivor (returning from 2019 to 2020)
S.W.A.T.
Tough as Nails
United States of AlNew series:Abbott ElementaryBeyond the EdgeCome Dance with MeCSI: VegasFamily LawFBI: InternationalGhostsGood SamHow We RollNCIS: HawaiʻiThe Thing About PamWomen of the MovementNot returning from 2020–21:Call Your Mother
Connecting
MacGyver
NCIS: New Orleans
Next
One Day at a Time
Private Eyes
Prodigal Son
Superstore
The Unicorn

Renewals
CBC
Moonshine—Renewed for a second season on November 10, 2021.
Sort Of—Renewed for a second season on February 25, 2022.
Son of a Critch—Renewed for a second season on February 28, 2022.

Citytv

CTV/CTV 2
Children Ruin Everything—Renewed for a second season on February 4, 2022.
Transplant—Renewed for a third season on February 17, 2022.

Global
Departure—Renewed for a third season on May 27, 2021.
Family Law—Renewed for a second season on May 27, 2021.

Cancellations/series endings
CBC

Citytv
Black-ish—It was announced on May 14, 2021, by creator ABC that season eight would be the final season. The series concluded on April 19, 2022.
Dancing with the Stars—It was announced on April 8, 2022, by creator ABC that from its thirty-first season onward, the series would be moving to Disney+.
Duncanville–Canceled on June 26, 2022. by creator Fox, after three seasons. The last six episodes will stream exclusively on Hulu.
The Endgame—Canceled on May 12, 2022, by creator NBC.
Kenan—Canceled on May 12, 2022, by creator NBC, after two seasons.
Mr. Mayor—Canceled on May 12, 2022, by creator NBC, after two seasons. The series concluded on May 17, 2022.
Ordinary Joe—Canceled on March 4, 2022, by creator NBC.

CTV/CTV 2
B Positive—Canceled on May 12, 2022, by creator CBS, after two seasons.
Our Kind of People—Canceled on May 13, 2022, by creator Fox.
Pivoting—Canceled on May 13, 2022, by creator Fox.
Queens—Canceled on May 6, 2022, by creator ABC.
This Is Us—It was announced on May 12, 2021, by creator NBC that season six would be the final season. The series concluded on May 24, 2022.

Global
Bull—It was announced on January 18, 2022, by creator CBS that season six would be the final season.
Good Sam—Canceled on May 12, 2022, by creator CBS.
How We Roll—Canceled on May 12, 2022, by creator CBS. The series concluded on May 19, 2022.
SEAL Team—It was announced on May 18, 2021, that after airing the first four episodes of the fifth season on Global and creator CBS, the series would be moving to Paramount+ for the remainder of its run.
The Thing About Pam—The miniseries is meant to run for one season only; it concluded on April 12, 2022.
United States of Al—Canceled on May 12, 2022, by creator CBS, after two seasons. The series concluded on May 19, 2022.
Women of the Movement—The miniseries is meant to run for one season only, it concluded on January 20, 2022.

Weekly ratingsNote''': Certain programs rated by Numeris are aggregates of multiple productions (such as local newscasts on a network's owned-and-operated stations) that may include common national advertising, and/or averaged over multiple broadcasts during the week.

See also
 2021–22 United States network television schedule

References

 
 
Canadian television schedules